Gymnapogon is a genus of fish in the family Apogonidae. They are native to the Indo-West Pacific and central Pacific Oceans, where they occur in reefs and nearby habitat types. These species are usually no more than 5 centimeters long and have semitransparent bodies without scales. The genus name is a compound noun formed by combining the Greek gymnos meaning "naked", referring to the lack of scales in the type species, Gymnapogon japonicus, and Apogon, the type genus of the Apogonidae. One species, the B-spot cardinalfish (Gymnapogon urospilotus), is notable for its larvae being rather large, conspicuous and fast-swimming.

Species
There are currently 9 recognized species in this genus:
 Gymnapogon africanus J. L. B. Smith, 1954 (Crystal cardinalfish)
 Gymnapogon annona (Whitley, 1936) (Naked cardinalfish)
 Gymnapogon foraminosus (S. Tanaka (I), 1915)
 Gymnapogon janus T. H. Fraser, 2016 
 Gymnapogon japonicus Regan, 1905
 Gymnapogon melanogaster Gon & Golani, 2002 
 Gymnapogon philippinus (Herre, 1939) (Philippines cardinalfish)
 Gymnapogon urospilotus Lachner, 1953 (B-spot cardinalfish)
 Gymnapogon vanderbilti (Fowler, 1938) (Vanderbilt's cardinalfish)

References

Pseudaminae
Marine fish genera
Taxa named by Charles Tate Regan